The Monasterium Magnificat is a monastery of the Annunciade Order, located in Westmalle, Belgium. It is the only monastery of this order in Belgium. It was created from the merger of three monasteries which existed in 1965: Tienen (1629), Geel (1853), and Merksem (1898). The new monastery was built between 1966 and 1970 in the midst of a quiet forest belonging to Westmalle Abbey. Marc Dessauvage (1931-1984) was the architect of the building.

See also
 Saint Joan of France

Sources
Monastérium Magnificat
Annuntiaten

External links
 Annonciade

Servite Order
Christian monasteries in Antwerp Province
Malle